An axial stone circle is a particular type of megalithic ring of stones of which many are found in southwest Ireland. Archaeologists have found it convenient to consider axial five-stone circles and axial multiple-stone circles separately – this list is of multiple-stone circles, those with seven stones or more. They have an approximate axis of symmetry aligned in a generally northeast–southwest direction – the stone at the southwest side of the circle, rather than being an upright orthostat like all the rest, rests on the ground with its long axis horizontal. Because it marks the axis it is called the axial stone. It is usually quite thin and it lies with its long thin edge along the circumference of the ring.

Dating from the Bronze Age, axial stone circles when constructed had an odd number of stones with two stones (portal stones) placed on either side of where the axis crosses the northeast side of the ring. They are found in County Cork and County Kerry.

Early in the 20th century they were called recumbent stone circles by analogy with similar examples in Scotland but when it became clear there were substantial differences the term "Cork–Kerry stone circle" was adopted. The term "axial stone circle" has since become frequently used leaving it unclear whether both types or only the multiple type is meant.

Ireland's National Monuments Service, part of the Department of Culture, Heritage and the Gaeltacht, operates a database of archaeology sites and the list in this article covers the sites classified as "stone circle – multiple-stone". The NMS definition is: 

Included are 41 sites in County Cork, 15 in County Kerry and a single one in County Clare.

List of axial multiple-stone circles

The map shows the locations of the 56 sites in counties Cork and Kerry (an additional site in County Clare is off the map). All the locations can be displayed dynamically via the OpenStreetMap viewer.

See also
List of recumbent stone circles

Notes

References

Citations

Works cited

General references
  – excavation of Drombeg
  – excavation of Bohonagh
   – excavation of Reanascreena
  – excavation of Cashelkeelty

List of axial multiple-stone circles
List of axial multiple-stone circles
List of axial multiple-stone circles
Bronze Age Ireland
Axial multiple-stone circles, List of